The rose-bellied bunting or Rosita's bunting (Passerina rositae) is a species of bird in the family Cardinalidae, the cardinals or cardinal grosbeaks. It is endemic to a very small area of southern Mexico.

Taxonomy and systematics

The rose-bellied bunting is monotypic.

Description

The adult male's crown is purplish-blue, and it is electric blue on the rest of its upperparts that fades from darker to lighter towards the tail. Its chin is grayish, the throat and chest blue, and the belly and vent area salmon pink. The adult female's head and upperparts are gray-brown with a bluish tinge at the rump. Its undersides are pinkish buff, warmer on the throat becoming paler towards the lower belly.

Distribution and habitat

The rose-bellied bunting's core range is a narrow strip along the Pacific slope of the Isthmus of Tehuantepec in eastern Oaxaca and western Chiapas. There is one additional record further east in Chiapas, in El Triunfo Biosphere Reserve. It inhabits arid to semiarid thorn forest, moister gallery forest, and swamp forest.

Behavior

Feeding

The rose-bellied bunting forages alone or in pairs in the lower to mid-level of its habitat. Its diet consists of seeding grasses and fruit from trees and bushes.

Breeding

Two rose-bellied bunting nests have been described. One found in late July had freshly laid eggs, the other had eggs well along in incubation in late June. The nests were open cups of dead leaves and bark lined with finer material; they were placed in crotches of small saplings. One clutch had three eggs and the other four. No other information about the species' breeding phenology has been published.

Vocalization

The rose-bellied bunting's song is "a sweet, slightly burry warble" . Its call is "a wet 'plik' or 'plek'" .

Status

The IUCN has assessed the rose-bellied bunting as Near Threatened "because it has a small range, which may be in decline owing to habitat degradation and infrastructure development."

References

External links
 Encyclopedia of Life. Rose Bellied Bunting. Encyclopedia of Life

rose-bellied bunting
Endemic birds of Southern Mexico
Near threatened fauna of North America
rose-bellied bunting
Taxonomy articles created by Polbot